The Liberation Rite of Water and Land is a Chinese Buddhist ritual performed by temples and presided over by high monks. The service is often credited as one of the greatest rituals in Chinese Buddhism, as it is also the most elaborate and requires the labor of monastics and temple staff and the financial funding of lay Buddhist sponsors. The ceremony is attributed to the Emperor Wu of Liang, who was inspired one night when he had a dream which a monk advised him to organize a ceremony to help all beings living on land and in the seas to be surfeited from their suffering, hence the name of the rite. The ritual itself was compiled by the Chan Buddhist master Bao Zhi.

The main goal of the ceremony is to invite beings of higher realms to help the beings in the lower realms get out of their sufferings. It is said that those who participate receive great merit and blessings, even to those who do not contribute.

The ritual combines pre-Tang Chinese operatic text as well as ceremonial procedure inspired by Taoism and Vajrayana such as circumambulating, reciting sutras and repentance. Chinese instruments not usually used in Buddhist ceremonies are also employed.

Shrines
Several halls are erected for this festival. The first is known as the Inner Shrine, while the others constitute the Outer Shrine. Each performs its own ceremony for a different purpose. The primary focus is the Inner Shrine, which infers the collective merits of the Outer Shrine.

Inner
The Inner Shrine is the core of the entire liberation rite and the most elaborate of all the other shrines. The inner shrine comprises twenty-four smaller altars: twelve for the higher beings and twelve for the lower beings. Each altar has their own classification ranging from other buddhas, bodhisattvas, sages, and celestial protectors, down to the lower beings dwelling in the six realms of rebirth: lesser devas, demigods, humans, animals, hungry ghosts, hell beings, and deceased individuals. Each altar has a set of paper plaques decorated with paper flowers and talismans which contain the core essence of the invited spirit and a painting that describes who each of the beings are, along with a verse taken from the inner shrine ritual text. Lastly, tables are set out for the monastics and sponsors to use, complete with kneelers, the ritual text for reference, a handheld censer, and plates with flowers to use when inviting beings.

As it requires deep concentration among all of the monastics, sponsors, and guests attending, many temples usually restrict public access to the shrine so that only high ranking and assigned monks, sponsors, and special guests are invited to enter when the ritual is not in session. When a ritual session begins, apart from any pressing emergencies, no one is allowed to leave the shrine  until its completion, as it is considered disrespectful to the invited beings. Offerings of food, beverages and incense, chanting and reciting of secret mantras and various sutras, transmitting precepts and bowing in repentance on behalf of the higher and lower beings are the core procedures in the inner shrine.

Outer
The outer shrine usually consists of separate halls, all of which are open for public participation to help create merit for the work being done in the inner shrine. Each shrine recites different sutras such as the Lotus Sutra, Śūraṅgama Sūtra, Golden Light Sutra and other texts as required. The Emperor Liang Repentance, the foundational text for the liberation rite, is also recited multiple times. 

Even as the ritual in both the inner and outer shrines are being held throughout the day and night, the routine morning and evening sessions of chanting and meditation in the monastery or temple are not neglected; some sponsors may choose to stay in retreat at the monastery during that time to join the daily sessions.

Procedures
Before such ceremony can take place, a purification of the entire temple or monastery space must be completed, usually presided by the abbot or elder monastics. Once it is finished, the outer and inner shrines are opened and all will simultaneously start their own service.

Procedures from the inner shrine
Setting the boundary (結界): Through the recitation of secret mantras, a ritual purification and boundary is placed around the inner shrine to protect it from negative influences, allowing the rite to progress without outside hindrances, and for all beings to be invited without obstruction. 
Issuing the invitation (發符):  A ritual writ of invitation describing the intent of the main donors that the liberation rite is occurring at the temple is issued by the presiding masters. This is done in the form of a paper horseman who is tasked with issuing the invite. This paper horseman is then burned outside the temple premises. Meanwhile, a giant banner (for the higher beings) and lanterns (for the lower beings) are raised on tall bamboo stalks or flagpoles, a paper effigy sentry is erected outside the inner shrine, and a ceremonial bulletin announcing the liberation rite and who the sponsors are ritually marked by the temple abbot using a calligraphy brush.
Inviting and offering to the higher beings (請上堂/供上堂): A cloth bridge and pavilion for bathing is set up to invite beings from the higher realms to be present for the ritual. Once invited, offerings of incense, food, flowers, and other delicacies are made, all while the Dharma teaching is ritually imparted.
Issuing petitions (告赦): A petition is issued specifically to Brahma, Sakra, deities from the lower realms and locality gods to grant reprieve to lower beings to allow them to be present for the liberation rite. Another paper horseman is ritually burned and sent off.
Inviting and offering to the lower beings (請下堂/供下堂): As in the previous invitation, a cloth bridge is set up to welcome lower beings into the inner shrine. Esoteric mantras are recited to bring the beings from the lower and hell realms to be present for the ritual. More offerings of incense, food, flowers, and other delicacies are made as the Dharma teaching is imparted.
Precepts for the dead (幽冥戒): In the evening, the presiding masters will invoke teachings to the invited lower beings. The registered ancestral or deceased relations of the main sponsors will also ritually receive the precepts by proxy.
Final offering and send off (圓滿香/送聖): A final offering of incense, food, drink, and flowers are made to all invited beings. The last ritual is often the most elaborate and elegant of the rituals, as it involves rare musical performance from monastics and invited orchestral bands. Each of their effigies in the inner shrine (in the form of paper plaques) are paraded on the temple grounds and collectively placed onto a paper boat and burned, symbolizing their ascent to the pure land. The burning of the boat serves as an aid to visualizing the beings ascent and also serves to mark the conclusion of the liberation rite.

Required recited texts and rituals for the outer shrine
While the inner shrine is conducting the ritual, separate shrines will also conduct their own sessions for reciting sutra texts. Because of the large requirement of sutra texts and rituals, the responsibility is often divided among the invited monastic Sangha. Therefore, having one monastic reciting a text will count toward having one required text recited.

The required texts for the outer shrine as suggested by Chan Master Baozhi are the following: 

1 recitation of the Avatamsaka Sutra (because of its length and time constraints, it is usually divided by sections and traditionally read silently by the most senior bhikkhus)
24 recitations of the Surangama Sutra
24 recitations of the Lotus Sutra
24 recitations of the Golden Light Sutra
24 recitations of the Perfect Enlightenment Sutra
24 recitations of the Longer Sukhāvatīvyūha Sūtra
24 recitations of the Amitayurdhyana Sutra
120 recitations of the Diamond Sutra
120 recitations of the Medicine Buddha Sutra
48 recitations of the Brahma Net Sutra chapter on the bodhisattva precepts
2 recitations of the Ksitigarbha Pūrvapraṇidhāna Sūtra
24 recitations from the Emperor Liang repentance text
2 general repentances 
A minimum of 7 full days of reciting the Shorter Sukhāvatīvyūha Sūtra and  reciting the name of Amitabha Buddha

In addition, during the duration of the liberation rite, one ritual session is held in the early morning for offering to the twenty-four guardian deities, and five tantric ritual sessions are held at night for hungry ghosts. Some temples and monasteries may elect to include more than the prescribed texts listed.

Rarity
Because of the ceremony's exquisite and very detailed ritual procedure, most temples may hold it only once and possibly may not hold one again because of the strenuous cost to invite monks, as well as the difficulty in having to set up the ritual platforms itself. The ceremony itself may draw large crowds of practitioners and donors  but it might also affect a temple financially; hence this can be seen as a way of demonstrating skillful means by showing the importance of the concept of anatta, or non-self, in Buddhism, while still dedicating merits to relieve suffering in all beings. The ceremony is common in Mainland China and elsewhere in East Asia since most monks have practiced and mastered procedures for this ceremony for years. In modern times, it has become common for some temples to prepare months or years in advance by having the monastics recite and perform the required texts in advance.

See also
Monlam Prayer Festival
Shuni-e

External links
Exhibit at Warren Wilson College, 2004

Buddhist festivals